The U.S. Highways in Indiana are those sections of United States Numbered Highways owned and maintained by the Indiana Department of Transportation (INDOT).


List

Special routes

See also

References

Lists of roads in Indiana